Antonia Ružić (born 20 January 2003) is a Croatian tennis player. Ružić represents Croatia in the Fed Cup.

ITF Circuit finals

Singles: 5 (4 titles, 1 runner-up)

Doubles: 2 (runner–ups)

Fed Cup participation

Doubles

References

External links
 
 
 

2003 births
Living people
Croatian female tennis players
21st-century Croatian women